The women's water polo tournament at the 2004 Summer Olympics was contested between August 16 and August 26 at the Olympic Aquatic Centre in the Athens Olympic Sports Complex. Eight teams qualified for the Games, with Italy defeating the host nation Greece for the gold medal.  The United States won the bronze medal.

Format
The eight qualifying teams were split into two groups of four for the preliminary round, which was played in a round-robin format.  The top teams in each group advanced directly to the semi-finals, while second and third place teams advanced to the quarter-finals.  Classification matches were also played to determine the final ranking for all teams.

Participating nations
Group A
 (Oceania champions)
 (host nation)
 (qualifying tournament second place)
 (Asia champions)

Group B
 (qualifying tournament fourth place)
 (qualifying tournament first place)
 (qualifying tournament third place)
 (2003 Pan American Games champions)

Squads

Preliminary round
All times are EEST (UTC+3)

Group A

Group B

Final round
Bracket

7th place match
All times are EEST (UTC+3)

Quarterfinals
All times are EEST (UTC+3)

5th place match
All times are EEST (UTC+3)

Semifinals
All times are EEST (UTC+3)

Bronze medal match
All times are EEST (UTC+3)

Gold medal match
All times are EEST (UTC+3)

Ranking and statistics

Final ranking

Top goalscorers

Medallist

Awards
The women's all-star team was announced on 29 August 2004.

Most Valuable Player
  Tania Di Mario (14 goals, 7 sprints won)

Media All-Star Team
 Goalkeeper
  Georgia Ellinaki (40 saves)
 Field players
  Tania Di Mario (14 goals, 7 sprints won)
  Rita Drávucz (7 goals, 6 sprints won)
  Kyriaki Liosi (9 goals, 21 sprints won)
  Martina Miceli (9 goals)
  Evangelia Moraitidou (7 goals)
  Brenda Villa (7 goals)

References

Sources
 PDF documents in the LA84 Foundation Digital Library:
 Official Results Book – 2004 Olympic Games – Water Polo (download, archive)
 Water polo on the Olympedia website
 Water polo at the 2004 Summer Olympics (women's tournament)
 Water polo on the Sports Reference website
 Water polo at the 2004 Summer Games (women's tournament) (archived)

Women's tournament
2004 in women's water polo
Women's events at the 2004 Summer Olympics